Kuntze is a surname of German origin. People with that name include:

 Carl Kuntze (1922-2006), Dutch rower who competed at the 1952 Summer Olympics
 Edward J. Kuntze (1826-1870), Prussian-born American sculptor
 Otto Kuntze (1843-1907), German botanist whose standard botanical abbreviation is Kuntze
 Reimar Kuntze (1900-1949), German cinematographer
 Tadeusz Kuntze (1733-1793), Silesian painter
 Walter Kuntze (1883-1960), German general and war criminal
 Wandir Kuntze (born 1950),  Brazilian rower who competed at the 1976 and 1980 Summer Olympics

See also
 Kunze, a surname
 Kuntz (disambiguation)
 Cuntz, a surname
 

Surnames of German origin
Surnames from given names